Watching the Sky is the second studio album by Australian indie pop band Sheppard, released on 8 June 2018. The album was confirmed in January 2018 with George Sheppard saying "an album is the true artistic statement, so announcing Watching the Sky is a really exciting step for us."

The album was supported by a week of in-store appearances across Australia from 8 June 2018.

In July 2018, the band announced a 30-venue national tour commencing on 10 August in Mount Isa and concluding on 20 October in Gold Coast, Queensland. The tour is their biggest national tour to date.

Reception

Mac McNaughton from The Music said "Kids need this kind of non-threatening, relentlessly up-beat optimism and they'll lap it up" and that the album has "many sickly sweet highs". David from auspOp said "The band doesn't mess with the formula that makes them so appealing" adding "There's nothing terrible about this album, but it just doesn't seem to go anywhere." David praised the songs "Coming Home", "Love Me Now" and "Edge of the Night". Stack Magazine said the group have "delivered" on their second studio album, adding "[al]though not everything works. For example, 'Edge of the Night' over-reaches, trying too hard to be a party anthem but ending up sounding like a Peter Andre out take." The publication also acknowledged that "for every misfire there's a banger to ignite the party", saying "'Castaways' and 'Sorry' show genuine pop smarts" and "'We Belong' and 'Live for You' showcase Amy Sheppard's powerful vocal, which is perhaps underutilised." Mikey Cahill from the Herald Sun said "They ply feel-good, treacly jams that will turn your stomach. Their aim: to serve up inoffensive party pop. They nail the brief on "Coming Home" and "Love Me Now"... they fail on "Edge Of the Night" and … the rest of the LP."

Track listing

Charts

Release history

See also
 List of number-one albums of 2018 (Australia)

References

2018 albums
Sheppard (band) albums